This is a survey of the postage stamps and postal history of Queensland, a former British Crown Colony that is now part of Australia.

First stamps
The first stamps of Queensland were issued on 1 November 1860. Before that, Queensland used the stamps of New South Wales from 1851. All of Queensland's postage stamps portrayed Queen Victoria with the exception of two stamps depicting allegorical figures of Australia (1903, 1907). Between 1 January 1880 and 1 July 1892, revenue stamps of 1866-1892 were authorised for postal use. In 1913 the stamps of Queensland were superseded by those of Australia.

A significant collection of Queensland stamps is held at the Queensland Museum.

See also
Postage stamps and postal history of Australia
Revenue stamps of Queensland

References

Further reading
 Campbell, Hugh M. Queensland Cancellations & Other Postal Markings 1860-1913. Melbourne: Royal Philatelic Society of Victoria, 1977 161p.
 Campbell, Hugh M. Queensland Postal History. Melbourne: Royal Philatelic Society of Victoria, 1990 326p.
 Hull, A.F. Basset. The Postage Stamps, Envelopes, Wrappers, Post Cards and Telegraph Forms of Queensland. London: Royal Philatelic Society, London, 1930 181p.

External links
Why I love collecting Queensland stamps.

History of Queensland
Philately of Australia
Postal history of Australia
Postage stamps of Australia